Muddy Branch is a tributary stream of the Potomac River in Montgomery County, Maryland, United States, located about  northwest of Washington, D.C.

Course

Tributaries
Decoverly Tributary
Dufief Tributary
Lakes Tributary
Pennyfield Lock Tributary
Potomac Grove Tributary
Query Mill Tributary
Quince Orchard Knolls Tributary
Rich Branch
Route 28 Tributary

Recreation
Parts of Muddy Branch flow through Blockhouse Point Conservation Park and the Muddy Branch Stream Valley Park. There is a boat ramp on Muddy Branch just before it goes under the C & O canal that can be used by small boats (such as canoes and kayaks) to access the Potomac River.

See also
List of Maryland rivers

References

External links
Muddy Branch and Watts Branch Subwatersheds Implementation Plan (2012) - Montgomery County Department of Environmental Protection
Muddy Branch Alliance - Community watershed group

Rivers of Montgomery County, Maryland
Tributaries of the Potomac River
Rivers of Maryland